Integrator complex subunit 11 is a protein that in humans is encoded by the CPSF3L gene.

References

External links

Further reading